Maryland Route 489 (MD 489) is a state highway in the U.S. state of Maryland.  Known as Park Hall Road, the state highway runs  from MD 5 east to MD 235 within Park Hall Estates in southern St. Mary's County.  MD 489, which serves as a connector between MD 5 and MD 235 south of Lexington Park, was assigned to Park Hall Road in 1956.

Route description

MD 489 begins at an intersection with MD 5 (Point Lookout Road) in the unincorporated community of Park Hall Estates between St. Mary's City and Great Mills.  The state highway heads east as a two-lane undivided road through a mix of farmland and forest.  MD 489 reaches its eastern terminus at MD 235 (Three Notch Road) between Ridge and Lexington Park.

History
MD 489 was assigned to Park Hall Road in 1956.  Aside from repaving, the state highway has changed very little since then.

Junction list

See also

References

External links

MDRoads: MD 489

489
Maryland Route 489